NO2 is nitrogen dioxide.

NO2 may also refer to:

 Nitrite ion, NO2−
 Nitronium ion, NO2+
 –NO2, nitro group, characteristic of nitro compounds
 "NO2", a song by American rock band Phish, from their album Phish

See also 
 Number Two (disambiguation)
 N02 (N-zero-two)